The Silcox Hut is a small rustic mid-mountain lodge located at  elevation on Mount Hood, Oregon, United States. It is approximately  vertical above Timberline Lodge and roughly one mile distance directly up the mountain.

Silcox Hut was built by the WPA and finished in 1939.  It was named after Ferdinand Silcox, the fifth Chief of the Forest Service, 1933–1939.

The hut was the upper terminal of the original Magic Mile chairlift and housed the lift's upper bullwheel in what is now the guest sleeping quarters.  It was also intended as a warming hut and starting point for climbers.  After the chairlift was relocated in 1962, it was abandoned and became derelict due to vandalism and fierce mountain weather.

In 1966, the Portland State University Outdoor Program leased the Hut. The students of the Program made a few improvements to the hut including repairs to the fireplace hearth and new window shutters. Program Alumni consider this lease the first action taken to save Silcox Hut.  There was discussion between the US Forest Service and Timberline Lodge to burn down the hut because of its condition. Even though the Program enjoyed access to the mountain provided by Silcox Hut, they could not counter the seemingly constant vandalism and had to relinquish the lease.

Silcox Hut was added to the National Register of Historic Places in 1985.
In the same year, the Friends of Silcox Hut was created as a non-profit organization.
The initial restoration proposal was made by climbing enthusiasts and guides, and it was their intention to operate the facility.

Over the course of the late 1980s and early 1990s, The Friends of Silcox Hut renovated and reopened Silcox to the public in 1993.  Although they intended it partially as an overnight hostel and restaurant for climbers, it is now rented out to groups of up to 24 for overnight lodging and hearty meals by RLK, the operators of Timberline Lodge.  It is available for group day use such as weddings and anniversaries.

The Friends of Silcox received several awards for its restoration, including the People's Choice Award and the Craftsmanship Award from the Portland AIA Awards Program in 1993.

The Friends of Silcox Hut carries on as a non-profit maintenance and special projects group to protect the integrity of the restoration. Its board is entirely made up of architects and craftsmen and others deeply involved in the original restoration. Lifetime and annual memberships are available with all proceeds supporting restoration efforts.

Recent special projects included a snow tunnel for the south entrance engineered to withstand 25 feet of compacted snow.

References

External links 

 

Buildings and structures in Clackamas County, Oregon
National Register of Historic Places in Clackamas County, Oregon
Works Progress Administration in Oregon
Mount Hood
Mount Hood National Forest
1939 establishments in Oregon
Buildings and structures completed in 1939